Masarm or Masaram may refer to:
 Masarm-e Olya
 Masarm-e Sofla